Isidro Sánchez may refer to:

 Isidro Sánchez (soccer, born 1987), Canadian soccer player
 Isidro Sánchez (footballer, born 1936), Spanish footballer